Moreya or Moriya (洩矢神, Moriya- / Moreya-no-Kami) is a Japanese god who appears in various myths and legends of the Suwa region in Nagano Prefecture (historical Shinano Province). The most famous of such stories is that of his battle against Takeminakata, the god of the Grand Shrine of Suwa (Suwa Taisha). 

Moriya is regarded as the mythical ancestor of the Moriya clan (守矢氏), a priestly family that formerly served in the Upper Suwa Shrine (上社, Kamisha), one of the two sub-shrines that make up Suwa Taisha. In addition, he is venerated as a local tutelary deity (ubusunagami) in a shrine in Okaya City near the Tenryū River, which in later variants of the aforementioned myth is identified as the place where Takeminakata and Moriya fought each other.

Local historians have long interpreted the story of the conflict between the two deities as the mythicization of a historical event in which a powerful local clan that ruled the Lake Suwa region and its vicinity (identified with the Moriya) was defeated by invaders who wrested control of the area (identified in turn with the Suwa clan, the high priestly lineage of the Upper Suwa Shrine that claimed to be Takeminakata's descendants), although a number of scholars have recently argued that it may actually be of later origin, heavily influenced by or outright based on medieval legends concerning the conflict between Prince Shōtoku and the anti-Buddhist ōmuraji Mononobe no Moriya, who may have been the inspiration for the god's name.

Name
What is currently the most commonly used rendering of Moriya's name in kanji, 洩矢, appear in sources such as the Suwa Daimyōjin Ekotoba (1356) and the genealogical record of the Moriya family compiled during the early Meiji period (late 19th century) known as the Jinchō Moriya-shi Keifu (神長守矢氏系譜, "Genealogy of the Jinchō Moriya Clan"). It is also the rendering adopted by Moriya Shrine (洩矢神社) in Okaya City in Nagano, where the deity is enshrined. A number of other texts (see below) meanwhile refer to the god as Moriya Daijin (守屋大臣), an epithet more often used for the historical Mononobe no Moriya in medieval and later sources.

Background

Suwa Shrine and its priesthood

The Grand Shrine of Suwa (Suwa Taisha) in Nagano Prefecture consists of four shrines grouped into two sites: the Upper Shrine (上社, Kamisha), located southeast of Lake Suwa, in the cities of Chino and Suwa, and the Lower Shrine (下社, Shimosha), located in the town of Shimosuwa in the northern side of the lake. Historically, the Upper and Lower Suwa Shrines essentially functioned as two separate entities, each with its own set of shrines, religious ceremonies, and priests.

Before the rise of State Shinto in the Meiji period, the position of head priest or Ōhōri (大祝) in the Upper Shrine was occupied by members of the Suwa clan (諏訪氏, Suwa-shi), also known as the Miwa or Jin (神氏, Jinshi / Miwa-shi). The Suwa traditionally traced its lineage back to the shrine's deity Takeminakata, who is also known as Suwa Daimyōjin (諏訪大明神), the "Great Deity of Suwa." For a long time, the occupant of the high priestly office was revered as a god in the flesh (arahitogami), the living incarnation or "body" (shintai) of Suwa Daimyōjin.

The second-highest office was that of the Kan-no-Osa or Jinchō (神長), later known as the Jinchōkan (神長官). This priest officiated the Upper Shrine's ceremonies, including the Ōhōri's investiture ceremony, which accorded him a preeminent status in the hierarchy. He also had the prerogative of summoning and inhering the Mishaguji, divine spirits who figure in some of the shrine's religious rites, onto objects who will serve as their vessels (yorishiro) for the duration of these rituals and then dismissing them at their conclusion. The hereditary occupants of this office were members of a clan called Moriya (守矢氏, Moriya-shi), who claimed to have descended from a certain local god named Moriya or Moreya, who had been subjugated by Takeminakata.

Mythology

Moriya and Suwa Daimyōjin
The most famous story involving Moriya is that of his battle against Takeminakata / Suwa Daimyōjin, who is said to have come to the Suwa region seeking to dwell there or to conquer it. One version of this myth involves the Suwa deity or his subordinate defeating Moriya, described as armed with a certain kind of iron weapon or implement, using only a wisteria (藤, fuji) branch or vine. Another variant has Suwa Daimyōjin facing and defeating Moriya on the battlefield.

"Moriya the evil outlaw" in the Suwa Daimyōjin Ekotoba 

What is perhaps the most well-known version of the story is found in the 1356 text Suwa Daimyōjin Ekotoba, where it is recorded as the origin myth of Fujishima Shrine (藤島社, Fujishima-sha) in Suwa City, one of the Upper Shrine's auxiliary shrines where its yearly rice-planting ceremony is traditionally held.

The myth is also found in a Shinto-Buddhist liturgical eulogy (講式, kōshiki) to the Suwa deity, the Suwa Daimyōjin Kōshiki (諏方大明神講式), thought to have been composed by the Ekotobas author, Suwa (Kosaka) Enchū (1295-1364), around the same time as the former text. The story is here integrated into a medieval legend that claims Suwa Daimyōjin to have originally been a king from India who, after performing heroic feats, attained enlightenment and traveled to Japan, where he manifested himself as a local kami. Moriya is identified in this text as an incarnation of the demon king (魔王, Maō) who first antagonized the future Suwa Daimyōjin back in India in the form of a traitorous vassal who fomented a rebellion against the king and then reappeared in Japan as "Moriya the evil outlaw" (洩矢惡賊), where he battled the Suwa deity. After being defeated, Moriya ran away and hid in a mountain behind the Upper Shrine called Moriyagatake (洩矢ヶ嶽, lit. "Moriya's peak"), known today as Mount Moriya (守屋山, Moriya-san). Moriya, aliased "Yamabe no Moriya" (山家洩矢) and described as the "god's archnemesis" (神明之讎敵, shinmei no shūteki), is compared with Mononobe no Moriya, the "sworn enemy of Buddhism" (佛法之怨敵, Buppō no onteki).

"Moriya Daijin" in the Suwa Nobushige Gejō

A document supposedly submitted to the Kamakura shogunate in 1249 (Hōji 3) by Suwa Nobushige, then Ōhōri of the Upper Shrine (now considered to be a forgery composed a century later at the earliest), known as the Suwa Nobushige Gejō (諏訪信重解状, "The Petition (Gejō) of Suwa Nobushige"), features a slightly different version of the myth.

In the petition, Nobushige claimed that "a careful inspection of the ancient customs" revealed that the Upper Shrine stands on what was once land owned by 'Moriya Daijin' (守屋大臣). He then relates a story about how Suwa Daimyōjin came down from heaven to take possession of Moriya Daijin's territory, but the latter would not let him. The dispute between the two eventually escalated into armed conflict, but as no winner could be declared, they competed in a kind of tug of war using hooks (kagi) made out of wisteria (藤鎰) and iron (鐵鎰), in which the Suwa deity emerged the victor. The triumphant Suwa Daimyōjin then banished Moriya and planted the wisteria kagi in front of his newly-built dwelling, the future Upper Shrine. The wisteria miraculously turned into a grove known as the "Forest of Fujisuwa" (藤諏訪之森, Fujisuwa no mori), which in turn gave its name to the region.

In other late medieval texts

The preface of a genealogical record of the Suwa clan thought to date from the 16th century titled the Jinshi / Miwa-shi Keizu (神氏系図, "Genealogy of the Miwa / Jin Clan") states that many conflicting stories concerning the origins of Suwa Daimyōjin exist: the Sendai Kuji Hongi for instance identifies him as Takeminakata, the son of the god Ōkuninushi, but another legend claims that the Suwa deity first appeared during the time of Emperor Yōmei (reigned 585-587). According to this story, Suwa Daimyōjin, accompanied by an eight-year-old boy named Arikazu (有員), came to Suwa and fought a battle against a certain 'Moriya' (守屋) at Mount Moriya. Moriya was eventually defeated by "divine soldiers" (神兵) led by Arikazu, after which Arikazu established a sanctuary (the Upper Suwa Shrine) on the slopes of the mountain. Suwa Daimyōjin, clothing the boy with his own garments, declared him to be his visible "body" and then disappeared. Suwa Daimyōjin is identified by the story as the manifestation of the bodhisattva Samantabhadra (Fugen), while Arikazu, who became the founding ancestor of the Suwa clan, is identified with Manjushri (Monju).

The same legend is found in another genealogical text titled the Miwa-ke / Jinke Keizu (神家系図, "Genealogy of the House of Miwa / Jin") or the Ōhōri-ke Keizu (大祝家系図, "Genealogy of the Ōhōri House"), and the Ten'in Goroku (天陰語録), a Muromachi period work authored by the Rinzai monk Ten'in Ryūtaku (天隠龍沢, 1422-1500). These two works name Suwa Daimyōjin's opponent 'Moriya Daijin' (守屋大臣) or 'Daijin Moriya' (大臣守屋), in agreement with the Nobushige Gejō.

In Edo period texts

A kōshiki from Suwa Shrine surviving in three late 17th century manuscripts titled Suwa Kō-no-shiki (諏方講之式 / 諏訪講之式) describes Moriya Daijin (守屋大臣) as the tutelary god (地主, jinushi / 地主之靈祇, jinushi no reigi) of Suwa, which was originally named Yamabe (山家郡, Yamabe-gun / Yamabe no kōri). In order to decide who would gain ownership of the land, Suwa Daimyōjin and Moriya Daijin fought each other using wisteria (藤鑰 / 藤鎰) and iron kagi (鐵鑰 / 鐵鎰). Suwa Daimyōjin won and planted the wisteria, which eventually became known as Fujishima Myōjin (藤島明神). The name 'Suwa' is claimed here to have originated from Suwa Daimyōjin's exclamation: "Ah (suwa), I have won" (須和吾勝ヌ, Suwa ware kachinu).

A version of the myth is recounted in a mid-19th century work by merchant and kokugaku scholar Matsuzawa Yoshiakira (1791-1861), the Ken'yū Hongi (顕幽本記, "Fundamental Records of the Visible and Invisible [Realms]"). Here, the god Moriya (守屋神, Moriya-no-Kami) is portrayed as the original ruler of Suwa who prevented the "great god" (大御神, Ōmikami; i.e. Suwa Daimyōjin) from entering his domain. In response, the Suwa deity ordered his emissary, Fujishima Daimyōjin (藤島大明神), to subjugate Moriya. Moriya, who was no match for Fujishima Daimyōjin, finally surrendered and went away, allowing Suwa Daimyōjin to take over his land.

In the Jinchō Moriya-shi Keifu

In the late 19th century, Moriya Saneyoshi (守矢実久), the 76th Moriya clan head and the last person to serve at the Upper Shrine as Jinchōkan (hereditary priesthood having been abolished by the government in 1871), compiled a genealogy titled the Jinchō Moriya-shi Keifu (神長守矢氏系譜, "Genealogy of the Jinchō Moriya Clan"), which traces the family and their priestly office back to the mythic past.

This text is notable for grafting the kuni-yuzuri myth cycle found in the Kojiki and the Sendai Kuji Hongi into the Moriya legend, so that the Suwa deity (Takeminakata) is now portrayed as coming to Suwa after fleeing from the land of Izumo.

Other myths
Moriya and Yatsukao / Ganigawara

A story found in a late source claims that Takeminakata and/or Moriya (Moreya) fought another local deity named Yatsukao-no-Mikoto (矢塚男命), who died during the conflict.

A folk version of the story portrays Yatsukao, alias 'Ganigawara no Chōja' (蟹河原の長者), as a chieftain and horse breeder whose might and influence rivaled that of Moreya, one of the powerful chiefs of the region. After Moreya swore fealty to Takeminakata after his defeat, Ganigawara held Moreya in contempt for surrendering to the foreign invader and had servants publicly revile him as a coward. Although their insults went unheeded at first, Ganigawara's men eventually resorted to violence, shooting arrows at the palace Moreya and other deities were erecting for Takeminakata. In retaliation, Takeminakata raised up an army and launched an all-out attack against Ganigawara with Moreya at his side. Ganigawara, mortally wounded by an arrow in the ensuing skirmish, repents in his deathbed and entrusts his youngest daughter to Takeminakata. Takeminakata gives her hand in marriage to a god who was injured by Ganigawara's messengers while  guarding his palace.

The rain god of Mount Moriya

Behind the Upper Shrine, straddling the border between the cities of Suwa and Ina, stands the 1,650 metre-high Mount Moriya. On its eastern peak stands a miniature shrine or hokora enshrining a deity referred to in old documents as 'Moriya Daijin' (守矢大臣 or 守矢大神). This god is identified with either the Moriya of Suwa legend or the deified Mononobe no Moriya, who is worshiped in a shrine on the opposite (southern) side of the mountain, in the town of Takatō (part of Ina City). Indeed, the hokora is considered to be this shrine's oku (no) miya (奥宮, lit. "inner shrine" or "rear shrine").

Moriya Daijin is considered to be a weather deity who causes rain to fall when angered. Local rainmaking rituals once involved provoking the god into sending rain by vandalizing the hokora or throwing it down the mountain side.

Popular belief holds that rain falls whenever clouds gather around the mountain top. A local folk song advises people to prepare to mow the fields whenever the following signs of incoming rain are observed:

Offspring

One local tradition identifies Moriya as the father of the god Chikatō (千鹿頭神, also 'Chikato'), an obscure deity worshiped in a handful of shrines in the Suwa basin (specifically the cities of Chino and Suwa) and the neighboring municipalities of Tatsuno and Matsumoto.

The Jinchō Moriya-shi Keifu meanwhile claims him to have had two children, a daughter named Tamaruhime (多満留姫) and a son named Moriya (守宅神). Tamaruhime married Izuhayao (出速雄神), one of Takeminakata's sons, while the younger Moriya fathered Chikatō, who married Urakohime (宇良古比売命), the goddess of Mount Urako (宇良古山; identified with Chikatō Shrine (千鹿頭神社) in Kanda / Satoyamabe, Matsumoto).

Curiously, the genealogy portrays Moriya's biological bloodline to have ended with Chikatō. Subsequent generations instead trace themselves to Kodamahiko (児玉彦命), Takeminakata's grandson via Katakurabe (片倉辺命), who became the successor to the Moriya legacy as per the will of Takeminakata himself.

Analysis

 Setting 

As noted above, the story of Moriya being defeated by a wisteria branch / vine or an implement made from the plant is presented in some earlier texts such as the Suwa Daimyōjin Ekotoba as the origin myth of Fujishima (lit. "Wisteria Island") Shrine, one of the auxiliary shrines (sessha) of the Upper Suwa Shrine, located a short distance away from the Upper Shrine's main shrine (Kamisha Honmiya) in Nakasu, Suwa City.

 The Moriya myth and the Upper Shrine's origins 
The myth of Takeminakata's defeat of Moriya has long fascinated researchers due to its perceived connection with the enigma of the origin of the Upper Suwa Shrine and the relationship between the Suwa Ōhōri and the Moriya Jinchōkan.

The story has been interpreted either as a mythicization of a conflict between indigenous Jōmon hunter-gatherers of the Suwa region and agrarian Yayoi peoples who began to settle in the area, or between the local clans of Suwa and the expanding Yamato state somewhere during the 6th to 7th centuries CE (Asuka period). Accordingly, Moreya is believed by some to be a deified indigenous priest-chieftain or clan leader who once held political and religious authority over the Suwa region.

The author Iwao Ōwa (1990) meanwhile theorizes Moreya to be a personification of the guardian nature spirit or Mishaguji worshipped by the Moriya clan. He further proposes that Moreya/Moriya and Moriya/Morita - Moreya's son in the Jinchō Moriya-shi Keifu - were originally a single figure later split into two, with the elder Moriya (Moreya) being connected with hunting and the younger Moriya (Morita) being mostly associated with sedentary agriculture.

Moreya, the Moriya clan and Mononobe no Moriya

The similarity between the names of both Moreya/Moriya and the 6th century Ōmuraji Mononobe no Moriya, who opposed the introduction of Buddhism to Japan, had led to a long-standing conflation of the two figures (cf. Moreya being called Moriya Daijin in medieval texts).

A certain legend claims that a son of Mononobe no Moriya, named either Takemaro (武麿) or Otogimi (弟君), survived the defeat of the Mononobe in the Battle of Mount Shigi in 587 and fled to Suwa, where he married into the Jinchō Moriya clan; Takemaro is thus reckoned as a clan ancestor in the Jinchō Moriya-shi Keifu. A small mound in the Moriya clan's historical estate in Chino dated to the 7th century is claimed in family lore to be Takemaro's tomb.

Ōwa (1990) believes this story to be modelled after the biography of Mononobe no Masara (物部麻佐良), who according to the Sendai Kuji Hongi married Imoko (妹古), the daughter of an unidentified 'Suwa-no-Atai' (須羽直) during the reign of Emperor Buretsu in the late 5th century, yet sees it as at least being inspired by a real-life connection between the Mononobe clan and Shinano Province.

Moriya Shrine in Okaya City where Moreya is worshipped currently denies any connection between the god and the Mononobe chancellor.

Descendants

Moreya is held to be the ancestor of the Moriya clan (守矢氏), which traditionally served as priests of the Suwa Kamisha.

The chief priest of the Kamisha was the ōhōri or ōhafuri (大祝 'great priest'), who was considered to be a living deity and the embodiment of Suwa Myōjin, the god of the shrine. Assisting the ōhōri (who by tradition was a member of the Suwa clan, Suwa Myōjin's supposed descendants) were five priests, at the head of which was the kan-no-osa (神長, also jinchō) or jinchōkan (神長官), an office occupied by members of the Moriya clan. The jinchōkan oversaw the Kamisha'''s rites and ceremonies in general and summoned Mishaguji - a god or gods thought to inhabit rocks or trees worshipped in the region since ancient times and regarded by the Moriya as their patron deity - to possess individuals or inanimate objects during ceremonies, being the only one considered to be able to do so.

It has been observed that the religious climate of Suwa is a syncretism of ancient indigenous beliefs and practices (e.g. the worship of Mishaguji) reorganized under a Yamato framework (e.g. Suwa Myōjin/Takeminakata, the cult of the ōhōri), but with the local element still predominant. Despite (or perhaps because of) his officially being a living god and the Kamishas chief priest, the Suwa ōhōri - who assumed the office during childhood - had little, if any, real power or influence in the shrine's affairs, which firmly rested in the hands of the Moriya jinchōkan, with his unique ability to hear Mishaguji and call upon the god(s) to descend upon someone or something and his knowledge of special rituals, which were closely guarded secrets traditionally passed down via word of mouth only to a single individual, the heir to the office of jinchōkan.Miyasaka (1987). p. 27.

The establishment of State Shinto in the Meiji period abolished the tradition of hereditary succession among Shinto priests and private ownership of shrines. Accordingly, the shrine at Suwa passed under the control of the state, with government appointees replacing the clans who had historically served as its priests, the Suwa and the Moriya among them. As the ancient priestly offices of the shrine became defunct, most of the unwritten tradition once guarded by the Moriya jinchōkan died with the last occupant of the position. A museum dedicated to preserving information about the Moriya and documents owned by the family, the Jinchōkan Moriya Historical Museum (神長官守矢史料館 Jinchōkan Moriya Shiryōkan), currently stands on the clan estate in Chino City, Nagano.

Shrine

A single shrine to Moreya, Moriya Shrine (洩矢神社 Moriya-jinja), stands in Okaya City, Nagano, near the Tenryū River. On the opposite bank stands Fujishima Shrine (藤島神社 Fujishima-jinja), where legend says Suwa Myōjin stood or encamped during the battle.  The other Fujishima Shrine (藤島社 Fujishima-sha''), where the wisteria Suwa Myōjin used during the battle was supposedly planted and sprouted, is in Nakasu, Suwa City.

See also
Suwa taisha
Takeminakata
Mishaguji
Suwa Daimyōjin Ekotoba
Mononobe no Moriya

Notes

References

Bibliography

External links
Official website of Moriya Shrine (洩矢神社公式HP) 
Jinchōkan Moriya Historical Museum on Chino City's official website 

Hunting gods
Japanese deities
Japanese mythology
Nature gods
Shinto
Shinto kami
Suwa faith
Kunitsukami